Owl's Nest is a historic house in Lake George, New York.

Owl's Nest may also refer to:
Owl's Nest Country Place, a country club in Greenville, Delaware
Owl's Nest Park, a city park in Cincinnati, Ohio